Dandothi  is a village in the southern state of Karnataka, India. It is located in the Chitapur taluk of Kalaburagi district in Karnataka.

Demographics
 India census, Dandothi had a population of 5991 with 3023 males and 2968 females.

See also
 Districts of Karnataka

References

External links
 Kalaburagi (Gulbarga) district website

Villages in Kalaburagi district